The Journal of the International Association of Tibetan Studies (JIATS)  is a freely available  online, peer-reviewed English language academic journal focusing on Tibetan studies. JIATS is an official publication of the International Association of Tibetan Studies (IATS), the association that organizes the world's major academic conference for Tibetan Studies, the results of which are published in the Proceedings of the International Association of Tibetan Studies (PIATS) series.

JIATS is hosted by the Tibetan and Himalayan Library (THL) and, since it is part of an online digital library, articles and submissions can incorporate digital content such as maps, audio recordings, images, and video. JIATS is not published in a print version.

The current Editors-in-Chief of JIATS are: David Germano (UVa)and José Ignacio Cabezón (UC, Santa Barbara).

External links
 JIATS - web site

Tibetology
Asian studies journals
Cultural journals
English-language journals
Publications established in 2005
Open access journals
Works about Tibet